Messy Christmas is a 2007 German comedy film directed by Vanessa Jopp.

Cast and characters
 Martina Gedeck as Sara Meinhold
 Heino Ferch as Jan Meinhold
 Roeland Wiesnekker as Andi
 Jasmin Tabatabai as Rita
  as Gunnar
  as Eva
  as Erich
 Meret Becker as Pauline
  as Thomas
 Ursula Doll as Anne
 Alexandra Neldel as Isabell

See also
 List of Christmas films
 In Bed with Santa (1999)
 Divin Enfant (2014)

References

External links
 

2000s Christmas comedy films
German Christmas comedy films
Remakes of Swedish films
2007 comedy films
2007 films
2000s German films